RV Corystes is an ocean-going, research vessel operating around Northern Ireland. She is equipped with specialist fishing gear and acoustic techniques for surveys of fish stocks.

History
RV Corystes was built for the Centre for Environment, Fisheries and Aquaculture Science (Cefas) and operated from a homeport of Lowestoft.

She was transferred to the Northern Ireland Department of Agriculture and Rural Development, (DARD) on 31 January 2005. In April 2006, the Science Service of DARD amalgamated with the Agricultural Research Institute of Northern Ireland, to form the Agri-Food & Biosciences Institute, who now operate the Corystes.

On 7 June 2006, Corystes rescued four from a life-raft, 20 miles east of Drogheda, after they abandoned the burning Kilkeel trawler MFV Noroyna.

Layout
RV Corystes has 250 m2 of deck area. She has two trawl winches fitted with 1000m x 24mm warps and a net drum with 7 tonnes pulling power. There is a 7 tonnes stern A-Frame with 7m clearance and a smaller starboard A-Frame. She is equipped with a comprehensive range of navigation and echo sounding equipment.

Service
RV Corystes is an ocean-going, research vessel which carries out marine fisheries, oceanographic and environmental monitoring and research, around Northern Ireland and nearby waters. She uses specialist fishing gear and acoustic techniques for surveys of fish stocks.

References

Ships built in Scotland
1988 ships
Ships of the Centre for Environment, Fisheries and Aquaculture Science
Research vessels of the United Kingdom